Fléty is a commune in the Nièvre department in central France.

Geography
The river Alène flows westward through the commune.

Demographics
On 1 January 2019, the estimated population was 93.

See also
Communes of the Nièvre department

References

Communes of Nièvre